Eddy Carazas (born 27 February 1974 in Peru) is a Peruvian retired footballer.

References

External links
 
 

Living people
1974 births
Peruvian footballers
Peru international footballers
Association football forwards
Association football wingers
Association football midfielders
Club Universitario de Deportes footballers
Tigres UANL footballers
Defensores de Belgrano footballers
Deportivo Coopsol players
Sport Boys footballers
U.D. Leiria players
Peruvian Primera División players
Peruvian Segunda División players
Liga MX players
Argentine Primera División players
Primeira Liga players
Peruvian expatriate footballers
Peruvian expatriate sportspeople in Mexico
Peruvian expatriate sportspeople in Argentina
Peruvian expatriate sportspeople in Portugal
Expatriate footballers in Mexico
Expatriate footballers in Argentina
Expatriate footballers in Portugal
Footballers from Lima